Ligota Wielka  (German: Groß Ellguth) is a village in the administrative district of Gmina Łagiewniki, in Dzierżoniów County, Lower Silesian Voivodeship, in south-western Poland.

The village has a population of 350.

References

Villages in Dzierżoniów County